Blastobasis atmozona is a moth in the family Blastobasidae. It was described by Edward Meyrick in 1939. It is found in Argentina.

References

Blastobasis
Moths described in 1939